This is a list of members of the South Australian Legislative Council from 1924 to 1927

 The two MLCs for Northern District in the previous parliament whose terms were not due to expire until 1927, Sir John George Bice and John Lewis, both of the Liberal Federation, had both died in the second half of 1923. Their seats were filled simultaneously with the 1924 elections for the other class of seats, with four members instead of the usual two being elected, and the third and fourth-placed candidates, William George Mills and Percy Blesing, being elected for a half-term.

References
Parliament of South Australia — Statistical Record of the Legislature

Members of South Australian parliaments by term
20th-century Australian politicians